Katrina Jacks (c. 1986 in Monmouth, Wales – 16 May 2010 in Lake Titicaca, Peru), was a Welsh rower and chemical engineering graduate.

Biography
Jacks was born in Monmouth, the second child and first daughter to General Practitioners Alasdair and Susanna. She had an older brother and a younger sister.

Education
Jacks went to Haberdashers' Monmouth School for Girls and attended Imperial College, London, graduating with a first class degree in chemical engineering.

Competitive rowing
Jacks won a number of gold medals at the National Schools Championships, and represented Great Britain at under-16 level for two consecutive years. She was part of the Welsh eight at the 2006 Commonwealth Rowing Championships at Strathclyde Park in Motherwell, Scotland, winning silver with the Welsh team.

Death
Due to start a job with an engineering consultancy company in summer 2010, Jacks took a gap year in South America from 2009 to improve her Spanish. Jacks died of an apparent dose of altitude sickness, which affects human beings above , on 16 May 2010. Her body was returned to Wales for burial in late May 2010.

References

Sportspeople from Monmouth, Wales
Alumni of Imperial College London
People educated at Haberdashers' Monmouth School for Girls
Welsh female rowers
1986 births
2010 deaths